British, Australian and New Zealand Sign Language (BANZSL), is the language of which British Sign Language (BSL), Auslan and New Zealand Sign Language (NZSL) may be considered dialects. These three languages may be considered dialects of a single language (BANZSL) due to their use of the same grammar, manual alphabet, and the high degree of lexical overlap. The term BANZSL was coined by Trevor Johnston and Adam Schembri.

BSL, Auslan and NZSL all have their roots in a deaf sign language used in Britain during the 19th century.

American Sign Language and BANZSL are unrelated sign languages. However, there is still significant overlap in vocabulary, probably due largely to relatively recent borrowing of lexicon by signers of all three dialects of BANZSL, with many younger signers unaware which signs are recent imports.

Between Auslan, BSL and NZSL, 82% of signs are identical (per Swadesh lists). When considering identical as well as similar or related signs there are 98% cognate signs between the languages. By comparison, ASL and BANZSL have only 31% signs identical, or 44% cognate.

According to Henri Wittmann (1991), Swedish Sign Language also descends from BSL. From Swedish SL arose Portuguese Sign Language and Finnish Sign Language, the latter with local admixture; Danish Sign Language is largely mutually intelligible with Swedish SL, though Wittmann places it in the French Sign Language family.

Languages
BSL (sign attested from 1644 may not be BSL), with approximately 151,000 users
Australian SL (1860. ASL and ISL influences), with approximately 10 000 speakers 
 Papua New Guinea Sign Language, which is a creole formed with Auslan, used by 30,000 people 
New Zealand SL (1800s), used by approximately 20,000 people 
Northern Ireland SL (19th century - with American Sign Language and Irish Sign Language influences)
South African SL (somewhere between 1846 & 1881), used by perhaps 235,000 people
Maritime SL, with perhaps 100 extant users  
? Swedish Sign Language family (1800)
 Portuguese SL (1823)
 Finnish SL (1850s, with local admixture)

See also
 Old French Sign Language – a contemporary of BANZSL
 French Sign Language family

Notes

References
 Johnston, T. (2002). BSL, Auslan and NZSL: Three signed languages or one?  In A. Baker, B. van den Bogaerde & O. Crasborn (Eds.), "Cross-linguistic perspectives in sign language research: Selected papers from TISLR 2000" (pp. 47–69). Hamburg: Signum Verlag.
 McKee, D. & G. Kennedy  (2000). Lexical Comparison of Signs from American, Australian, British, and New Zealand Sign Languages. In K. Emmorey and H. Lane (Eds), "The signs of language revisited: an anthology to honor Ursula Bellugi and Edward Klima". Lawrence Erlbaum Associates, Inc.

BANZSL Sign Language family
Deaf culture